José Serrano may refer to:
 José António Serrano (1851–1904), Portuguese physician and anatomist
 José E. Serrano (born 1943), Member of the U.S. House of Representatives for a portion of The Bronx, New York
 José M. Serrano (born 1972), his son, New York State Senator
 José Serrano (Ecuadorian politician) (born 1970), Ecuadorian political figure, currently Minister of the Interior
 José Serrano (composer) (1873–1941), Spanish zarzuela composer
 José María Galante Serrano (1948–2020), Spanish activist known as Chato Galante
 José Mariano Serrano (1788–1852), Bolivian member of the Congress of Tucumán
 José Serrano (footballer, born 1981), Spanish footballer
 José Serrano (pentathlete) (born 1957), Spanish pentathlete
 Rosso José Serrano (born 1942), Colombian police officer
 José Serrano (footballer, born 2002), Venezuelan footballer